James L. Blount (June 4, 1935 – August 22, 2017) was an American newspaper editor and historian.  Blount was editor of the Hamilton Journal-News, the daily newspaper in Hamilton, Ohio and wrote extensively on the history of Hamilton and Butler County, Ohio.

Biography
Blount was born June 4, 1935, in Hamilton, Ohio, the oldest of the five children of James and Julia (Mignerey) Blount. He graduated from Hamilton High School in 1953 and earned a B.S. in Education from the University of Cincinnati, and an M.A. in history from Miami University. He began his career in journalism at The Cincinnati Enquirer. He was hired by the Hamilton Journal-News in 1963. Blount was editor of the paper from 1971 to 1986.  He wrote a weekly column on local history in the Journal News from 1988 to 2004.
 
He left the newspaper to become a high school history teacher in 1986.

Blount was an advocate for road improvements in Butler County. He served on the board of directors of the Butler County Transportation Improvement District from 1994 until his death.

Blount married  Jackie Steigerwalt on December 27, 1958. They had two children, Brian and Lori.

Blount died in Hamilton, Ohio on August 22, 2017, at the age of 82.

Bibliography

References

External links
Collection of Local History Columns (1988-2015) by Jim Blount published in the Journal News and on the website of the Lane Public Library

1935 births
2017 deaths
People from Hamilton, Ohio
University of Cincinnati alumni
Miami University alumni
Editors of Ohio newspapers
Educators from Ohio
Historians from Ohio